Alex de Minaur (born 17 February 1999) is an Australian-Spanish professional tennis player. He achieved a career-high ATP singles ranking of No. 15 on 28 June 2021 and a doubles ranking of No. 58 on 12 October 2020.

Early life and junior career
De Minaur was born in Sydney, Australia. His father, Anibal, is Uruguayan and his mother, Esther, is a Spaniard. His father owned an Italian restaurant on George Street in Sydney and met Esther when she began working there as a waitress. De Minaur has two brothers and three sisters — Dominic, Daniel, Natalie, Cristina, and Sara.

His name is commonly pronounced , inspiring both his nickname of the Demon and his logo used when signing the camera lens after winning matches.

De Minaur has dual Australian and Spanish citizenship. He spent the first five years of his life in the south Sydney suburb of Carss Park before relocating to Alicante, Spain. He completed most of his early education in Spain before returning to Australia at age 13. As of 2015, de Minaur was living in Spain. De Minaur has stated that he has always felt a strong bond with Australia even though he has lived most of his life in Spain. In 2017, he told the Sydney Morning Herald "I used to represent Spain but I always felt I was Australian. As soon as we moved back here again that was the first thing I wanted to do — play for Australia."

De Minaur is fluent in English and Spanish and also speaks some French.

De Minaur began playing tennis at age three at the Sydney Private Tennis Academy at the Parkside Tennis Courts in Kogarah Bay. He was coached by Kerry Dock and then by Cindy Dock, a former Australian player. He has been coached by Adolfo Gutierrez since he was nine years old and living in Alicante. De Minaur reached a career-high ranking of 2 on the juniors circuit and won the 2016 Australian Open boys' doubles title alongside Blake Ellis. Although Lleyton Hewitt has never officially been his coach, he continues to be a mentor.

Professional career

2015–2017: Early career success, turning pro

De Minaur plays tennis under the flag of Australia. He made his professional debut in July 2015 at the Spain F22, reaching the quarterfinals. He was given a wildcard into the qualifying rounds of the 2016 Australian Open, but lost in round one to Kimmer Coppejans. De Minaur then spent the majority of the 2016 season playing on the ITF circuit in Spain, reaching two finals. He made his first ATP Challenger Tour final in Eckental, Germany after qualifying, however lost to Steve Darcis in the final.

De Minaur commenced 2017 at the Brisbane International, where he defeated Mikhail Kukushkin and Frances Tiafoe in qualifying to reach his first ATP Tour main draw. He lost in the first round to Mischa Zverev. The following week, he received a wildcard into the Apia International Sydney where he defeated world No. 46, Benoît Paire to claim his first Tour-level win.

De Minaur made his Grand Slam debut at the 2017 Australian Open after receiving a wildcard. He faced Gerald Melzer in the first round and won in five sets after saving a match point in the fourth set. He lost to Sam Querrey in round two.

In May, de Minaur made his French Open debut after being awarded a wildcard. He lost the opening round to Robin Haase, in straight sets. In June, de Minaur lost in the first round of Nottingham and Ilkley Challengers and the second round of Wimbledon qualifying.

De Minaur was awarded a wildcard into the 2017 US Open, losing in round one to Dominic Thiem.

In December, de Minaur won the Australian Open play off for a main draw wildcard into the 2018 Australian Open. He finished the year with a singles ranking of No. 208.

2018: Two ATP finals, NextGen ATP Finals final, top 50 

De Minaur commenced the year at the Brisbane International after receiving a wildcard into the main draw. He defeated American Steve Johnson in straight sets before scoring a career high win against world number 24 Milos Raonic in straight sets. He then defeated qualifier Michael Mmoh in the quarterfinals before losing to Ryan Harrison in the semifinals. De Minaur is the lowest ranked player and the youngest to reach the semifinals of the men's draw in the Brisbane International's 10-year history.

De Minaur received a special exempt spot in the main draw of the Sydney event, where he consecutively eliminated Fernando Verdasco, Damir Džumhur and Feliciano López to reach his second ATP Tour semifinal; he reached this milestone just one week after having played in his first tour semifinal in Brisbane. De Minaur became the youngest player to play in two consecutive ATP semifinals since Rafael Nadal in 2005. He beat Frenchman Benoît Paire in the semifinals to meet Daniil Medvedev in the final. De Minaur lost the final in three sets, having won the opener.

At the 2018 Australian Open, de Minaur lost in the first round to Tomáš Berdych, but took a set off of the 19th seed.

He was awarded a wildcard into the 2018 French Open, but lost in the first round to British 16th seed Kyle Edmund. 
Following this, he made two consecutive Challenger finals, losing to Jérémy Chardy at Surbiton, before defeating Dan Evans in straight sets to claim his first Challenger-level title at the Nottingham Open.

He saw his best results to date at a major at Wimbledon, defeating 29th seed and French Open semifinalist Marco Cecchinato and Pierre-Hugues Herbert to reach the third round, where he fell to world No.1 and second seed Rafael Nadal.

In Washington, de Minaur defeated Vasek Pospisil, 11th seed Steve Johnson, eighth seed and Australian Open semifinalist Chung Hyeon and received a walkover over Andy Murray to reach the semifinals where he faced Andrey Rublev. De Minaur saved four match points while down 2–6 in the second set tiebreak, winning six points in a row to win it 8–6. He then won the final set 6–4 to reach his first ATP 500 final against Alexander Zverev, in which he went down 4–6, 2–6. De Minaur entered the top 50 in the rankings for the first time at World No. 45 on 6 August 2018.

At the US Open, de Minaur defeated Taro Daniel and Frances Tiafoe before losing to seventh seed Marin Čilić in five sets. Later in the year, he replaced Nick Kyrgios as Australia's highest ranked male singles player.

De Minaur qualified as the second seed into the 2018 Next Generation ATP Finals. He beat Andrey Rublev, Taylor Fritz, Liam Caruana in group stage. He then defeated Jaume Munar in the semifinals, before losing to top seed Stefanos Tsitsipas.

2019: Three ATP titles, second NextGen ATP Finals final, top 20

De Minaur began his year with a quarter-final run in Brisbane, competing at a career-high of World No. 31 –– resulting in him being seeded for a Grand Slam tournament for the first time in his career at the upcoming Australian Open. At the 2019 Sydney International, straight-set victories over Dušan Lajović, Reilly Opelka, Jordan Thompson and Gilles Simon saw him return to the finals. He defeated Andreas Seppi (7–5, 7–6(7–5)) to claim his first career title.

Seeded No. 27 at the 2019 Australian Open, he lost in the third round to Rafael Nadal. De Minaur reached a then career-high ranking of World No. 24 in March 2019. Following the Australian Open, de Minaur suffered a groin injury, sidelining him for two months. At Wimbledon, De Minaur won his opening round before losing to Steve Johnson in the second round in five sets. De Minaur made his fourth ATP Final in Atlanta, where he defeated Taylor Fritz to clinch the trophy. He did not face a single break point in the four matches he played during the tournament, winning 116 of 123 first serve points.

At the US Open, de Minaur defeated Kei Nishikori in third round, earning his first career win over a top 10-ranked opponent. He reached the fourth round for the first time in the event, however, lost to Grigor Dimitrov 7–5, 6–3, 6–4.

In September, de Minaur claimed his 3rd ATP title beating Frenchman Adrian Mannarino in two sets in the final of the Zhuhai Championships. At the Swiss Indoors, de Minaur reached the final of an ATP 500 event for the second time in his career, losing to Roger Federer. As a result, de Minaur reached a career-high ranking of World No. 18.

De Minaur qualified as the first seed into the 2019 Next Generation ATP Finals. He beat Alejandro Davidovich Fokina, Miomir Kecmanović, Casper Ruud in group stage. He then beat Frances Tiafoe in the semis, before losing to Italian wildcard Jannik Sinner.

2020: US Open quarterfinal
De Minaur started new season by playing for Australia at the first edition of the ATP Cup. He won his first two matches beating Alexander Zverev of Germany and Denis Shapovalov of Canada. Facing Great Britain in the quarter-finals, he lost his singles match to Dan Evans. However, in doubles, he and Nick Kyrgios won a three-set thriller over Jamie Murray and Joe Salisbury to send Australia to the semifinals. However, in the semifinals, he was defeated by Rafael Nadal.

He withdrew from the first edition of the Adelaide International due to an abdominal strain. He also withdrew from the Australian Open due to the same injury. De Minaur returned from injury in February and played at the Mexican Open. He lost in the first round to Miomir Kecmanović. Due to the COVID-19 pandemic, many of the ATP tour tournaments were suspended.

At the Cincinnati Masters, his first tournament since February, he was eliminated in the first round by Jan-Lennard Struff. However, in doubles, de Minaur (partnered with Pablo Carreño Busta) won the 2020 Cincinnati Masters doubles title, defeating Jamie Murray and Neal Skupski in the final (6–2, 7–5).

At the US Open, he reached his first Grand Slam quarterfinal, where he was beaten by eventual champion Dominic Thiem.

In Rome, de Minaur was defeated in the first round by German qualifier Dominik Koepfer. At the French Open, he was beaten in the first round by qualifier and 2018 semi-finalist, Marco Cecchinato. At the European Open, de Minaur reached the final where he lost to Ugo Humbert. Following this, at the Paris Masters, he was knocked out in the third round by eventual champion, Daniil Medvedev.

He played his final tournament of the season at the Sofia Open, where he was defeated in the quarterfinals by the eventual champion Jannik Sinner. De Minaur ended the year ranked No. 23.

2021: Fifth ATP title, top 15
De Minaur started his 2021 season at the Antalya Open. Seeded fourth, he won his fourth ATP singles title when his opponent, eighth seed Alexander Bublik, retired from the final due to a right ankle injury. Playing for Australia at the 2021 ATP Cup, he lost both of his matches to Roberto Bautista Agut and Stefanos Tsitsipas. Seeded 21st at the Australian Open, he reached the third round where he was defeated by 16th seed Fabio Fognini.

In March, de Minaur competed at the Rotterdam Open. Here, he was eliminated in the second round by Kei Nishikori. Seeded ninth at the Dubai Championships, he fell in the second round to Jérémy Chardy. Seeded 15th at the Miami Open, he suffered a second-round upset at the hands of Daniel Elahi Galán.

Moving on to the clay-court season, de Minaur played at the Monte-Carlo Masters. He was beaten in the first round by Alejandro Davidovich Fokina. Seeded 14th at the Barcelona Open, he made it to the third round where he lost to second seed and eventual finalist, Stefanos Tsitsipas. In Madrid, he was defeated in the third round by third seed and two-time finalist, Dominic Thiem. At the Italian Open, he was eliminated in the first round by Italian wildcard Gianluca Mager. Seeded 21st at the French Open, he was beaten in the second round by Marco Cecchinato.

In June, de Minaur had a short but successful grass season. Seeded fourth at the Stuttgart Open, he reached the quarterfinals where he lost to Jurij Rodionov. Seeded fourth at the Queen's Club Championships, he made it to the semifinals where he fell to top seed Matteo Berrettini. In doubles, he and Cameron Norrie reached the semifinals where they lost to Reilly Opelka/John Peers. In the week before Wimbledon, he won his first title on grass and fifth in his career at the Eastbourne International defeating Lorenzo Sonego in the final. With this run, he reached a new career-high singles ranking No. 15. Seeded 15th at Wimbledon, he could not keep up his good form and lost in the first round to Sebastian Korda.

De Minaur pulled out of the Tokyo Olympics due to testing positive for Covid-19.

He returned to action in August at the Washington Open. Seeded third, he was defeated in the second round by Steve Johnson. Seeded 12th at the Canadian Open, he was eliminated in the second round by Nikoloz Basilashvili. Seeded 14th at the Western & Southern Open in Cincinnati, he fell in his second-round match to Gaël Monfils. Seeded 14th at the US Open, he lost in the first round to Taylor Fritz.

Seeded fourth at the Moselle Open, de Minaur's woes continued as he was defeated in the second round by Marcos Giron. Seeded third in Sofia, he again lost in the second round to Giron. Seeded 22nd at the Indian Wells Masters, he reached the fourth round where he faced second seed Stefanos Tsitsipas. He pushed Tsitsipas to three sets, but he ended up losing the match. Seeded sixth and last year finalist at the European Open, he fell in the first round to American qualifier Brandon Nakashima. In Vienna, he was eliminated in his second-round match by second seed and eventual champion, Alexander Zverev. At the Paris Masters, he was beaten in the first round by lucky loser and compatriot, Alexei Popyrin.

De Minaur ended the year ranked No. 34.

2022: Australian Open & Wimbledon 4th rounds, Sixth title, 150th win
De Minaur started his 2022 season by representing Australia at the ATP Cup. Australia was in Group B alongside Italy, Russia, and France. In his first match, he beat world No. 7, Matteo Berrettini, of Italy, for his first victory against a top 10 player since 2020. He then lost his second match to world No. 2, Daniil Medvedev of Russia, in straight sets. In his final tie, he defeated Ugo Humbert of France. In the end, Australia ended second in Group B. Seeded 32nd at the Australian Open, he reached the fourth round of a Grand Slam for the third time in his career and the first time at the Australian Open. He ended up losing to 11th seed and world No. 10, Jannik Sinner.

In February, de Minaur competed at the Rotterdam Open. He reached the quarterfinals where he lost to top seed, world No. 4, and eventual finalist, Stefanos Tsitsipas. In Dubai, he was defeated in the first round by Karen Khachanov. Playing for Australia in the Davis Cup tie against Hungary, de Minaur helped Australia win the tie 3–2 over Hungary by beating Zsombor Piros and Márton Fucsovics. Seeded 29th at the Indian Wells Masters, he made it to the fourth round where he was beaten by 20th seed and eventual champion, Taylor Fritz. Seeded 25th at the Miami Open, he lost in the third round to third seed and world No. 5, Stefanos Tsitsipas.

De Minaur started his clay-court season at the Monte-Carlo Masters. He lost in the second round to fifth seed, world No. 8, and last year finalist, Andrey Rublev, in three sets. Seeded 10th at the Barcelona Open, he upset fourth seed and world No. 10, Cam Norrie in the quarterfinals. He lost his semifinal match to fifth seed, world No. 11, and eventual champion, Carlos Alcaraz, in three sets, despite having two match points at 7-6(4), 6–5. In Madrid, he was defeated in the second round by 10th seed and world No. 12, Jannik Sinner. At the Italian Open, he reached the third round where he was beaten by second seed, world No. 3, and 2017 champion, Alexander Zverev. Seeded fourth at the Lyon Open, he reahed the semifinals where he fell to Alex Molčan. Seeded 19th at the French Open, he was knocked out in the first round by world No. 74 ranked Frenchman, Hugo Gaston, in a five set match which lasted almost 4 hours.

De Minaur started his grass-court season at the Libéma Open. Seeded fourth, he lost in the second round to 2019 champion Adrian Mannarino. At the Queen's Club Championships, he upset eighth seed and world No. 18, Reilly Opelka, in the first round. He was defeated in the second round by Alejandro Davidovich Fokina.

He won his sixth title at the 2022 Atlanta Open defeating James Duckworth (tennis), Adrian Mannarino, Ilya Ivashka and Jenson Brooksby in the final.

He won his 150th match at the 2022 Stockholm Open defeating Benjamin Bonzi. Next he defeated JJ Wolf and fourth seed Denis Shapovalov to reach the semifinals where he lost to Holger Rune. The following week at the next tournament in Basel he lost again to Holger Rune in the first round.
At the 2022 Rolex Paris Masters he won in the first round against Sebastian Korda. He reached the third round for the third time at this tournament defeating world No. 3 Daniil Medvedev for his biggest and first top-5 win in 19 attempts. 

De Minaur ended the year with a singles rank of 24.

2023: Seventh and first ATP 500 title, back to top 20
In January, De Minaur lost in the fourth round of the Australian Open to eventual champion Novak Djokovic in straight sets winning only 5 games.

In March, De Minaur won his seventh overall and first ATP 500 title at the Mexican Open, defeating Tommy Paul. As a result he returned to the top 20 in the rankings on 6 March 2023.

Following this run, at the 2023 BNP Paribas Open he lost in the second round in less then an hour and a half to Marton Fucsovics having received a bye in the first round.

Playing style

De Minaur is famous for his speed and agility on court, which have earned him the jocular title "Speed Demon" on the tour. 

He is known for his ability to retrieve seemingly impossible balls and hit winners from defensive positions or force opponents into making mistakes. His footwork and court coverage are considered some of the best on tour, though some have questioned the physical toll it could take on his body in the long-term. Despite this, his fighting spirit, "never say die" attitude and intensity on the court have earned him a huge fan base for a young player.

His baseline game suits that of a counterpuncher, often retrieving balls and slowly constructing points. However, he is also known to inject sudden pace into rallies to surprise opponents, and often opts for a one-two combination on his serve, using the serve and a powerful groundstroke to endpoints quickly. His forehand is significantly better than his backhand on the offensive, and he often uses it to construct points or hit winners when attacking.

De Minaur has a strong first serve, but his second serve is considerably weaker and  an attacking point for opponents. His volleys were initially a weakness too, but have improved, moving towards a more transitional offensive game.

Critics point out that despite his defensive capabilities, de Minaur does not possess any real weapons to use against top opponents. Some have argued his defensive game is unsustainable physically in the long-term and is not sufficient to challenge better players, as he tends to play himself out of aggressive positions.

National representation

ATP Cup
De Minaur made his ATP Cup debut for Australia in January 2020. He scored a victory against then world No.7 Alexander Zverev; which helped Australia claim a 3–0 victory over Germany. 

In 2022, he beat world No. 7 Matteo Berrettini (6–3, 7–6).

Davis Cup
In February 2018, De Minaur made his Davis Cup debut for Australia, against then world No.5 Alexander Zverev from Germany in the opening rubber. He fell just short of a spectacular upset, losing in a fifth-set tiebreaker after at one point leading 3–0, (40–Ad.) in the decider.

Olympics
De Minaur was selected to represent Australia at the 2020 Tokyo Olympics (to be held in July 2021), but was forced to withdraw after testing positive for Covid-19.

United Cup
De Minaur made his United Cup debut for Australia in December 2022. He scored a victory against the world No. 2 Rafael Nadal, his biggest career win thus far. It was his eight top-10 career win and only his second in the top-5. Despite this win Australia did not advance out of the group into the knockout stage.

Performance timeline

Singles
Current through the 2023 Australian Open.

Significant finals

Masters 1000 finals

Doubles: 1 (1 title)

ATP career finals

Singles: 11 (7 titles, 4 runner-ups)

Doubles: 1 (1 title)

ATP Next Generation finals

Singles: 2 (2 runner-ups)

Junior Grand Slam finals

Singles: 1 (1 runner-up)

Doubles: 1 (1 title)

Team competitions finals

Record against other players

Record against top 10 players
De Minaur's record against players who have been ranked in the top 10. Active players are in boldface:

Top 10 wins 
De Minaur has a  record against players who were, at the time the match was played, ranked in the top 10.

*

Personal life
As of March 2020, de Minaur is in a relationship with British tennis player, Katie Boulter.

Notes

References

External links

 
 
 
 

1999 births
Living people
Australian male tennis players
Tennis players from Sydney
Sportspeople from Alicante
Australian expatriate sportspeople in Spain
Australian people of Spanish descent
Australian people of Uruguayan descent
Sportspeople of Uruguayan descent
Australian Open (tennis) junior champions
Grand Slam (tennis) champions in boys' doubles
21st-century Australian people